The 2012–13 Scottish Challenge Cup, known as the Ramsdens Challenge Cup due to sponsorship reasons with Ramsdens, was the 22nd season of the competition. It was competed for by 32 clubs, which included the 30 members of the 2012–13 Scottish Football League, and for the second season running, the top two Highland Football League clubs with a valid SFA club licence.

The defending champions were Falkirk, who defeated Hamilton Academical in the 2012 final.

Inverurie Loco Works who finished fourth and Wick Academy eighth in the Highland Football League qualified for the competition for the first time after being asked to compete following their work in the SFA's Club Licensing programme. Clubs ranked higher such as Forres Mechanics were not compliant with the programme so the qualification spot moved to a lower ranked club. Buckie Thistle and Deveronvale were ruled out as they had been invited in the previous season's competition.

Schedule

Fixtures and results

First round

The first round draw was conducted on 12 June 2012 at the Falkirk Stadium, the home of the reigning champions Falkirk F.C., by former player Kevin McAllister and Ramsden's representative Stewart Smith. Like the previous season, the first round is separated regionally into two sections: north and east and south and west. After the draw was made, Rangers F.C. were placed in Division 3 of the SFL, being replaced in the SPL by Dundee FC. Following this change, Dundee's place in the competition was taken by Rangers.

North and East Region

Source: Scottish Football League

South and West Region

Source: Scottish Football League

Second round

The second round draw was conducted on 30 July 2012, at the Ramsdens store in the Forge Shopping Centre in Glasgow.

North and East Region

Source: Scottish Football League

South and West Region

Source: Scottish Football League

Quarter-finals

The quarter-final draw was conducted on 22 August 2012, at Hampden Park in Glasgow.

Source: Scottish Football League

Semi-finals

The semi-final draw was conducted on 19 September 2012, at Hampden Park in Glasgow.

Source: Scottish Football League

Final

References

External links
Ramsdens Cup at the Scottish Football League
Ramsdens – the tournament sponsor

Scottish Challenge Cup seasons
Challenge Cup
3